Olive Fraser (20 January 19099 December 1977) was a Scottish poet born in Aberdeen. Both her parents emigrated to Australia within a year of her birth, leaving Olive living with her great aunt in Nairn. She won the Calder Prize for English verse while studying  English at the University of Aberdeen, and the Chancellor's Medal for English Verse at University of Cambridge in 1935, but did not complete her studies at Cambridge for health reasons.

Most of her works were published posthumously.

Education 

 Millbank School, Nairn
 Rose's Academical Institution, Nairn 
 King's College, Aberdeen (graduated 1930)
 Girton College, Cambridge (did not graduate due to ill health)

Poetry 
The Scottish Poetry Library describes Fraser's style as follows:"... there was a never-extinguished sadness in Fraser’s life: the knowledge that she was an unwanted child. Her mother was cold to her, and her father and his family never recognised her (both parents returned from Australia, but lived apart). All this was reflected in her writing throughout her life, in poems of heartbreaking poignancy ..."Towards the end of her life, Fraser's health improved significantly following successful treatment for hypothyroidism, apparently a significant factor in her earlier depression; in this period which she referred to as 'wonderful years' she "regained energy, and was able to write again [...] she visited friends, went on holidays and continued to produce striking poetry until her death in 1977".

Notable works 
 Benighted in the Foothills of the Cairngorms: January
 The Adder of Quinag
 The Solitaires
 The Wrong Music (collection of Fraser's works, published posthumously, edited by Helena Mennie Shire)
 The Pure Account: the poems of Olive Fraser

References

External links 
 Scottish Poetry Library profile page

Scottish women poets
1909 births
1977 deaths
20th-century Scottish poets
20th-century British women writers
Alumni of the University of Aberdeen
People from Aberdeen
Writers from Aberdeen
20th-century Scottish women
Alumni of Girton College, Cambridge